Wenquan Township is a township in Jiaokou County in western Shanxi province, China. , it has 12 villages under its administration.

See also 
List of township-level divisions of Shanxi

References 

Township-level divisions of Shanxi